Harold FitzGerald "Gerry" Lenfest (May 29, 1930 – August 5, 2018) was an American lawyer, media executive, and philanthropist. In 2004, he was honoured to be a member of the American Philosophical Society.

Early life and career
Lenfest was born in Jacksonville, Florida, then later grew up in Scarsdale, New York, and Hunterdon County, New Jersey. After attending Flemington High School, and graduating from Mercersburg Academy, Lenfest went on to receive his BA from Washington and Lee University in 1953 and his LLB from Columbia Law School in 1958. He served in the Navy between college and law school.  Lenfest worked at the firm of Davis Polk & Wardwell before becoming, in 1965, associate counsel to Triangle Publications, Inc., the media company controlled by Walter Annenberg.  In 1970, he was named head of the Communications Division at Triangle.  He formed Lenfest Communications in 1974 and sold it to AT&T in 1999, who then sold it to Comcast in 2000 for $6.7 billion. Lenfest was the chairman of the board of directors and majority shareholder of the TelVue Corporation.

Later life and philanthropy
Lenfest's wife, Marguerite B. Lenfest has also played an active role in the Lenfest Group, and Suburban Cable TV Co., Inc. She serves on the board of several cultural institutions including the Pennsylvania Academy of the Fine Arts.

In or around 2002, Lenfest and his wife donated $5.5 million to help build the five-story "Lenfest Pavilion" addition to Abington Memorial Hospital in Abington Township, Montgomery County, Pennsylvania

Lenfest planned to donate all of his wealth to worthy causes before his death.  On March 21, 2007, Lenfest announced a donation of $33 million to be spent solely on faculty compensation at his alma mater, Washington and Lee University, where he served as a trustee, and an unpublished amount to Wilson College, his wife's alma mater.  In recent years, Lenfest has given over $100 million to Columbia University, where his donations include a $48 million challenge gift toward the endowment of 32 new professorships, $15 million toward construction of a Law School residence hall which bears his name, $15 million to support the programs of the Earth Institute, $12 million to endow awards for outstanding teaching, and most recently a $30 million pledge to help build an Arts Center venue on the Manhattanville campus.

'Gerry' and Marguerite Lenfest gave the Curtis Institute of Music in Philadelphia $63.6 million in endowment, annual giving, underwriting of faculty chairs and student fellowships, bricks and mortar. Lenfest is Curtis' board chairman.  Lenfest Hall, designed by Venturi, Scott-Brown & Associates, opened in summer 2011.  The Lenfests created a challenge program to endow faculty chairs.  Student tuition at Curtis is free.  (Source: Philadelphia Inquirer, Dec. 5, 2011, p. A1, A10-11.)

Lenfest was elected a trustee of the Philadelphia Museum of Art, in 1993, and became chairman of the Museum's board in 2001. From 2005 until his death, he was chairman of the Museum of the American Revolution. In 2006, he became chairman of the board of trustees of the Curtis Institute of Music.

Lenfest endowed the Lenfest College Scholars program, a $12,000 per year scholarship awarded to high school juniors from the south central Pennsylvania area.  Until 2007, he also endowed the Lenfest College Prep Scholarship, which was given to teenagers from eighth to tenth grade from certain areas of rural Pennsylvania to attend one of four private schools, Mercersburg Academy, The Perkiomen School, Westtown School, or Wyoming Seminary. 

Lenfest became friendly with Keith Leaphart, who cleaned Lenfest's office. The two went on to become businesses associates and Leaphart currently serves as the chair of the Lenfest Foundation.

In 2007, Lenfest donated over 1,000 acres of land in Newlin Township, Chester County, Pennsylvania to form the ChesLen Preserve, a mixture of woodlands and agricultural areas crisscrossed with hiking trails that is intended to remain minimally developed in perpetuity.

In July 2010, Lenfest donated $5.8 million to the SS United States Conservancy: $3 million to buy the ocean liner SS United States from Norwegian Cruise Lines and the rest to outfit the ship for its next use.

In June 2012, Lenfest made a $40,000,000 challenge grant to the Museum of the American Revolution to be located in Philadelphia, Pennsylvania.

Although Lenfest was not Jewish, he made several significant donations to Jewish causes including $500,000 to the National Museum of American Jewish History, $650,000 in donations to the American Friends of the Israel Museum in Jerusalem, the American Jewish Committee, and the JCC Macabbi games.

In January 2016, Lenfest donated Philadelphia Media Network—a holding company that owns The Philadelphia Inquirer, Philadelphia Daily News, and the newspapers' joint website, Philly.com—to The Philadelphia Foundation, a nonprofit organization, so that the two newspapers, a community asset, would stay in Philadelphia. Later, Lenfest donated $40 million in matching funds to the Philadelphia Media Network and agreed to work to get the Lenfest Institute for Journalism to $100 million in endowment funding towards long-term journalism.  

Lenfest died on August 5, 2018, at the age of 88.

References

1930 births
2018 deaths
American lawyers
Columbia Law School alumni
Giving Pledgers
21st-century philanthropists
People from Jacksonville, Florida
People from Scarsdale, New York
Washington and Lee University alumni
People associated with the Philadelphia Museum of Art
Davis Polk & Wardwell lawyers
Members of the American Philosophical Society